Marquess Marcello Amero D'Aste-Stella (April 1, 1853 – September 17, 1931) was an Italian admiral of the Regia Marina (Royal Italian Navy) and later a politician.

Amero d'Aste was born in the borough of Leca of the Ligurian city of Albenga, in an ancient Italian family of noble heritage. He took part as vice-admiral in the Italo-Turkish War and was the commander of naval operations in the 1912, when Italy began operations against the Turkish possessions in the Aegean Sea.

Until August 25, 1914 he was the Commander-in-Chief of the Italian Naval Army. During World War I Admiral Amero d'Aste participated in the Italian naval operations in the Adriatic Sea. After the war he was promoted to Admiral and was appointed Senator by King Victor Emmanuel III in 1919. He was for many years the president of the Senate Commission on War. He died in Rome.

1853 births
1931 deaths
People from Albenga
Members of the Senate of the Kingdom of Italy
Margraves of Italy
Italian admirals
Italian military personnel of the Italo-Turkish War
Italian military personnel of World War I